The first Asian Test Championship, organized by the Asian Cricket Council was held between 16 February and 16 March 1999. India, Pakistan and Sri Lanka competed in the tournament; Bangladesh could not compete because the ICC had not granted them Test status. This tournament was considered to be the predecessor to the Test Cricket World Cup that the ICC was planning for the nine member nations. The tournament was almost canceled in January 1999 due to tour conflicts, television rights and security concerns.

Three round-robin tournament matches were played with each team meeting each other once and the top two sides playing a final. A win was worth 12 points, a tie 6 points and no points were awarded for a draw or loss. In addition to this, bonus points were awarded to teams for bowling and batting performances (see Scoring system). The venues of the round robin matches were rotated between the three countries: India (Calcutta), Sri Lanka (Colombo) and Pakistan (Lahore), while the final was held in Dhaka, Bangladesh as a neutral venue.

Pakistan beat Sri Lanka by an innings and 175 in the final to become the first Asian Test Champions and received US$250,000 in prize money. Sri Lanka, the losing finalists, were awarded US$145,000, and India, the losers of the first round, US$100,000. 'Man of the Series', Wasim Akram, won US$20,000, while 'Man of the Match' winners received US$5,000 in prize money.

Squads

Umpires
The matches were officiated by two independent umpires of the ICC panel. This was the first time that this had occurred, traditionally one ICC umpire and one home umpire stand in Test matches. However, one home umpire was selected as the Third Umpire in each Test match. The ICC Match referee for the entire Championship was Cammie Smith of the West Indies.

Neutral Umpires:
 David Shepherd (England)
 Russell Tiffin (Zimbabwe) 
 Doug Cowie (New Zealand) 
 Rudi Koertzen (South Africa) 
 David Orchard (South Africa)
 Steve Bucknor (West Indies)

Third umpires:
 K. T. Francis (Sri Lanka)
 Srinivasaraghavan Venkataraghavan (India)
 Saleem Badar (Pakistan)

Scoring system

A scoring system was devised by the Asian Test Championship Technical Committee consisting of Duleep Mendis (tournament director), Ashantha De Mel, Sunil Gavaskar and Majid Khan. It was based on the systems used in the Asian countries' domestic leagues.

Bonus points were awarded to teams for good bowling and batting performances (see table below). A maximum of 20 points could be gained in one match (including the 12 match winning points). The bonus bowling and batting points were confined to the first 100 overs of the first innings. The two teams with the highest number of points qualify for the final. If two teams are tied on points, the team with a better run rate in the first 100 overs will go through. If the final ends in a draw, the side with the higher bonus points will win.

Match results

1st Test: India v Pakistan

2nd Test: Sri Lanka v India

3rd Test: Pakistan v Sri Lanka

Final: Pakistan v Sri Lanka

References

External links
 Tournament home at ESPN Cricinfo

1998-99
International cricket competitions from 1997–98 to 2000
Asian Test Championship, 1998-99
Indian cricket tours of Sri Lanka
Pakistani cricket tours of India
Sri Lankan cricket tours of Pakistan
1999 in Pakistani cricket